Izzat is the concept of honour prevalent in the culture of North India, Bangladesh and Pakistan. It applies universally across religions (Hindu, Muslim and Sikh), communities and genders. Maintaining the reputation of oneself and one's family is part of the concept of izzat, as is the obligatory taking of revenge when one's izzat has been violated.

The concept of izzat has been viewed as curtailing the freedom of women, yet characterised on a general level as a concept that cuts across social hierarchy and enforces "equality in giving, but also equality in vengeance." The idea of reciprocity, in both friendship and enmity, is deeply embedded in izzat. It is required that a person come to the assistance of those who have helped that person earlier. To not do so is to dishonour one's debt and lose izzat.

Dushmani and Badla
Violations or perceived violations of izzat are key to the development of both personal and family enmities (dushmani, दुश्मनी/, দুশমনি) as the wronged party seeks revenge (badla, बदला/, বদলা), which could result in cycles of counter-revenge, sometimes spanning generations. The concept of reciprocity applies to badla as well. The nature and intensity of the revenge, "and what is taken - life, resources, or position - is governed by izzat (honour), which is the principle of reciprocity or equivalence in all things." Because social relations in the region emphasize social debts and "unrestricted reciprocity" among kin, enmity can spread to individuals who were not involved in the original infractions of izzat and "rarely remains localized."

In politics
Izzat has played a significant role in the political dynamics of India and continues to do so to the current day. Various state rulers in the pre-1947 princely states of British-ruled India resisted British involvement in their kingdoms, despite nominally acknowledging British sovereignty, because such "intervention constituted an attack on their izzat." 

In post-independence India, the "politics of izzat" has been cited as a key reason for the rise of elected politicians from hitherto-backward communities, who have done little to economically benefit their communities but have created greater izzat for them by creating powerful political blocs. Politicians in power often frame populist policies in terms of izzat, such as with the 2009 Izzat Scheme launched by Indian Railways Minister, Mamata Banerjee, which provides a subsidy for poorer citizens to travel by train.

In military culture
The armed forces of India incorporate the concept of izzat as a powerful motivator. Several units of the military use the term in their mottos, such as the Indian Regiment of Artillery's "Sarvatra Izzat O Iqbal" (Everywhere with Honor and Glory).

See also
Honour killing
Namus
Pashtunwali

References

Indian culture
Pakistani culture

Bengali culture
Bangladeshi culture
Warrior code
Codes of conduct
Honor